Louis Cukela (May 1, 1888 – March 19, 1956) was a Croatian American United States Marine numbered among the nineteen two-time recipients of the Medal of Honor. Cukela was awarded the Medal by both the US Army and the US Navy for the same action during the Battle of Soissons in World War I. He was also awarded decorations from France, Italy, and Kingdom of Yugoslavia.

Famous for his broken English, best exemplified by his unforgettable saying, "If I want[ed] to send a goddamned fool, I'd go myself" (when a messenger came back with a stupid garbled reply).

Biography
Louis Cukela was born on May 1, 1888, in the Dalmatian city of Split (or Dubrovnik), today's Croatia (at the time Kingdom of Dalmatia, Austro-Hungarian Empire) to George and Johana (Bubrich) Cukela. His mother died in 1900. He was educated in the grade schools of Split, then attended the Merchant Academy and later, the Royal Gymnasium, both for two year courses. In 1913, Cukela emigrated to the United States and he and his brother settled in Minneapolis, Minnesota; his father and three sisters remained in Austria-Hungary.

On September 21, 1914, he enlisted in the United States Army. He was serving as a corporal in Company H, 13th Infantry Regiment when he was honorably discharged on June 12, 1916.

World War I

Seven months later, on January 31, 1917, with World War I raging in Europe and prior to the United States entry into the war, Cukela enlisted in the United States Marine Corps. He became a member of the 66th Company, 1st Battalion, Fifth Marine Regiment.

He was deployed to France in 1918 and fought in all the engagements in which the 5th Marines participated, from Belleau Wood to the Meuse River Crossing. Along the way he earned a commission as a second lieutenant, as well as the Medal of Honor and four Silver Star citations. From the French, there was the Légion d'honneur, the Médaille militaire (the first award of this prestigious decoration to a Marine officer) and the Croix de guerre 1914–18 with two palms and one silver star. Italy decorated him with the Croce al Merito di Guerra, while Yugoslavia weighed in with the Commander's Cross of the Royal Order of the Crown of Yugoslavia.

He was awarded the Medal of Honor by both the Army and the Navy (in the "Tiffany Cross" pattern) for the same action on the morning of July 18, 1918, near Villiers-Cotterets, France, during the Soissons engagement. The 66th Company, 5th Marines, in which Cukela was then a gunnery sergeant, was advancing through the Forest de Retz when it was held up by an enemy strong point. Despite the warnings of his men, the gunnery sergeant crawled out from the flank and advanced alone towards the German lines. Getting beyond the strong point despite heavy fire, "Gunny" Cukela captured one gun by bayoneting its crew. Picking up their hand grenades, he then demolished the remaining portion of the strong point from the shelter of a nearby gun pit. He took four prisoners and captured two undamaged machine guns.

Cukela was wounded in action twice but since there is no record of either wound at the Navy's Bureau of Medicine and Surgery, he was never awarded the Purple Heart. The first wound was suffered at Jaulny, France, on September 16, 1918, during the St. Mihiel engagement. Cukela was wounded again during the fighting in the Champagne sector. Neither wound was serious.

In addition to the two Medals of Honor, Cukela was awarded the Silver Star by the Army; the Médaille militaire (he was the first Marine officer ever to receive this medal), the Légion d'honneur in the rank of Chevalier, the Croix de guerre with two palms, another Croix de guerre with Silver Star, all by France; the Croce al Merito di Guerra by Italy; and Commander's Cross of the Royal Order of the Crown of Yugoslavia. He also received three Second Division citations.

Cukela received a field appointment to the rank of second lieutenant in the Marine Corps Reserve on September 26, 1918, and was selected for a commission in the regular Marine Corps on March 31, 1919. Promoted to first lieutenant on July 17, 1919, he was advanced to the rank of captain on September 15, 1921. His promotion to major was effected on the day of his retirement, June 30, 1940.

After World War I

After the war, Cukela served at overseas bases in Haiti, Santo Domingo, the Philippines, and Tientsin, China, and at domestic stations in Quantico, Virginia; Philadelphia, Pennsylvania; Norfolk, Virginia; Hampton Roads, Virginia; Mare Island, California; Washington, D.C.; Nashville, Indiana, and Fort Knox, Kentucky.
Cukela served as a second lieutenant of United States Marine Corps stationed at Maissade, Republic of Haiti in the times of the Second Caco War of 1919–1920. By 1919, Haitian Charlemagne Péralte had organized more than a thousand armed guerrillas (called cacos), to militarily oppose the United States Marine occupation. The Marines responded to the resistance with a counterinsurgency campaign that razed villages, killed thousands of Haitians, and destroyed the livelihoods of even more. Cukela was the one of the US military personnel questioned by a US Senate committee for the atrocities he committed and abuse of power. Cukela executed a group of prisoners in the middle of a Marine camp there. For this atrocity he was not court martialed rather transferred to another camp
. General Barnett, Marine Corps Commandant in 1920 set up a board headed by Colonel John H. Russell Jr. to decide which wartime temporary officers would be retired, demoted, or discharged. Educated men of good family were preferred over formerly enlisted men with little formal education. As a consequence of those criteria Cukela was demoted from first lieutenant to second lieutenant despite his wartime heroism.   However, by 1927 he was a captain of the 75th Company of Marines serving in Tientsin, China.

From June 1933 to January 1934, Cukela served as a company commander with the Civilian Conservation Corps. His last years in the Marine Corps were spent at Norfolk, where he served as the post quartermaster. Retired as a major on June 30, 1940, he was recalled to active duty on July 30, of the same year.

Retirement and death
During World War II the major served at Norfolk and Philadelphia. He finally returned to the inactive retired list on May 17, 1946. Cukela served a few days less than 32 years of active duty in the army and Marines.

On March 19, 1956, Cukela died at the U.S. Naval Hospital, Bethesda, Maryland. Following services at St. Jane Frances de Chantel Church, Bethesda, he was buried at Arlington National Cemetery.

Cukela was profiled in the August 2018 issue of Naval History magazine.

Decorations

Major Cukela had the following decorations and medals:
 Medal of Honor (Navy)
 Medal of Honor (Army)
 Silver Star
 World War I Victory Medal with Aisne, Aisne-Marne, St. Mihiel, Meuse-Argonne, and Defensive Sector clasps and three silver stars
 Haitian Campaign Medal
 Marine Corps Expeditionary Medal with one star
 Yangtze Service Medal
 American Defense Service Medal
 American Campaign Medal
 World War II Victory Medal
 Médaille militaire
 Légion d'honneur (Chevalier)
 Croix de guerre with two palms and silver star;
 Croce al Merito di Guerra
 Commander's Cross of the Royal Order of the Crown of Yugoslavia
 French Fourragère

Medal of Honor citations

Navy citation:
For extraordinary heroism while serving with the 66th Company, 5th Regiment, during action in Forest de Retz, near Viller-Cottertes, France, July 18, 1918. Sgt. Cukela advanced alone against an enemy strong point that was holding up his line. Disregarding the warnings of his comrades, he crawled out from the flank in the face of heavy fire and worked his way to the rear of the enemy position. Rushing a machine-gun emplacement, he killed or drove off the crew with his bayonet, bombed out the remaining part of the strong point with German hand grenades, and captured two machineguns and four men.

Army citation:

When his company, advancing through a wood, met with strong resistance from an enemy strong point, Sgt. Cukela crawled out from the flank and made his way toward the German lines in the face of heavy fire, disregarding the warnings of his comrades. He succeeded in getting behind the enemy position and rushed a machinegun emplacement, killing or driving off the crew with his bayonet. With German hand grenades he then bombed out the remaining portion of the strong point, capturing 4 men and 2 damaged machineguns.

Personal life
Cukela was married to Minnie Myrtle Strayer of Mifflintown, Pennsylvania, on December 22, 1923, in Washington, D.C. Mrs. Cukela died on August 10, 1956, just months after Major Cukela. At the time of his death, Major Cukela was also survived by a sister, Mrs. Zorka Cukela Dvoracek, of Šibenik, Croatia.

See also
 List of Medal of Honor recipients
 List of Medal of Honor recipients for World War I
 List of historic United States Marines

References
Inline

General

External links
 

1888 births
1956 deaths
United States Marine Corps personnel of World War I
United States Marine Corps personnel of World War II
American people of Croatian descent
Burials at Arlington National Cemetery
Civilian Conservation Corps people
Foreign-born Medal of Honor recipients
United States Navy Medal of Honor recipients
Recipients of the Croix de Guerre 1914–1918 (France)
Recipients of the Order of the Yugoslav Crown
Recipients of the Silver Star
Recipients of the War Merit Cross (Italy)
United States Marine Corps officers
World War I recipients of the Medal of Honor
Double Recipients of the Medal of Honor
United States Army Medal of Honor recipients
Austro-Hungarian emigrants to the United States
United States Army non-commissioned officers